Killer Moth (Drury Walker) is a supervillain appearing in comic books published by DC Comics, usually as an adversary and dedicated original foil personality of Batman (prior to the creations of Wrath, Prometheus, and Hush). Like Batman, he has no superpowers and relies on his technical equipment, including a Mothmobile and numerous gimmicks. Killer Moth originally wore a garish costume of purple and green striped fabric, with an orange cape and moth-like mask. In Underworld Unleashed, Killer Moth is transformed into the monster Charaxes with superhuman abilities.

Publication history 

Killer Moth first appeared in Batman #63 (February 1951) and was created by Bill Finger, Dick Sprang, and Lew Schwartz.

Fictional character biographies

"Cameron van Cleer" 
The original Killer Moth was a prisoner identified only by his prison number, 234026. While in prison, he reads a newspaper article about Batman and decides to set himself up as the "anti-Batman", hiring himself out to Gotham City's criminals to help them elude capture by police. Upon his release, he uses the hidden proceeds of his crimes to build a "Mothcave", modeled on the photos of the Batcave in the newspaper article he read. Killer Moth also establishes a false identity as millionaire philanthropist Cameron van Cleer. In this guise, he becomes friends with Bruce Wayne. Meanwhile, he promotes himself to Gotham's criminals using his identity as Killer Moth, giving them each an infrared Moth-Signal. In his first job, he rescues some criminals from the police and then uses his Mothmobile to defeat and capture Batman and Robin. The duo escape and lead Killer Moth to a climactic battle on Gotham Bridge, in which he is defeated. In his third appearance (Detective Comics #173 (July 1951)) Killer Moth kidnaps Bruce Wayne and learns his secret identity. However, he is shot by other criminals and the resultant cranial injury causes amnesia. He remains a persistent enemy through the Silver Age of Comic Books, being the first villain Batgirl encounters in Detective Comics #359 (January 1967). He teams up with the Cavalier twice: the first time in Batman Family #10 (March-April 1977), where they battle Batgirl and Batwoman (Kathy Kane, who comes out of retirement for the first time in years) and the second (and final) time in Batman Family #15 (December 1977-January 1978), where they battle Batgirl and Robin.

Drury Walker 
In the 1990s, in the Post-Crisis continuity, Killer Moth's real identity is revealed as Drury Walker, an unsuccessful criminal whom no one takes seriously. He again adopts the false identity of Cameron van Cleer and the persona of Killer Moth to fight Batman. This version first appears in Batman: Shadow of the Bat #7-9 (December 1992-February 1993), with a more detailed origin story appearing in Batgirl: Year One #1-9 (February-October 2003).

In Batman: Shadow of the Bat #7-9, Killer Moth sets up a team called "the Misfits", comprising Batman villains such as the Catman and the Calendar Man, to make another kidnapping attempt on Bruce Wayne, as well as other prominent citizens. This team proves unsuccessful, turning against Killer Moth when they realize he plans to kill the hostages. He is one of the villains who sells their souls to the demon-lord Neron in Underworld Unleashed #1 (November 1995) and in Robin (vol. 2) #23-24 (December 1995-January 1996), where he asks to become feared instead of always being laughed at. He is metamorphosed into a carnivorous moth-like monster called Charaxes. As Charaxes, Walker resembles a vaguely humanoid, giant brown moth. He consumes humans and spins cocoons in which to keep his prey. In a later story, Charaxes begins laying hundreds of eggs, all of which hatch into duplicates of Drury Walker. Charaxes despises his progeny, but is unable to destroy them. Following his capture, these duplicates are taken into government custody. During an argument between various bodies as to what should be done with them, they attack a scientist and are killed. At around the same time, the Oracle is confronted by a criminal named Danko Twag who claims to be the "real" Killer Moth (the one she had defeated), and that Drury Walker had been an impostor. During a rant in which he claims they are going to be a team, she captures him in an energy cell and he seemingly disintegrates himself.

In Infinite Crisis, Charaxes is killed by being ripped in half by Superboy-Prime during the Battle of Metropolis. To ensure the existence of Batman, Rip Hunter tells Booster Gold and Skeets that they have to make sure Wiley Dalbert, a time-travelling criminal who had hired Killer Moth, completes his crime successfully. Booster does this by dressing up as Killer Moth and taking his place. During the robbery, he is forced to fight with Batman and Robin and takes them both down. An unfortunate, unintended side effect of this is that, when they return to the present, Gotham still has no Batman and Killer Moth is now a serious threat, thanks to the "street cred" from the robbery. Booster, Skeets and his sister Goldstar attempt to fix the anomaly they created by taking Batman's place in the robbery, but things go wrong when Alfred Pennyworth intervenes; the Time Masters barely escape in the Batmobile. Instead they steal Batgirl's costume and purchase an Elvis costume for Booster. Booster stops the version of him dressed as Killer Moth from defeating Batman and makes sure that Wiley gets away with the loot, thus restoring the timeline.

During the Adventure Comics series' Blackest Night tie-in story, Charaxes is reanimated as a member of the Black Lantern Corps. Superboy-Prime destroys Charaxes on Earth Prime, using the black ring cycling through the power set, resulting in a burst of colored energy that destroys Black Lanterns. In The New 52, a more serious, less garish Drury Walker/Killer Moth appears as an enemy of Green Arrow.  This version, preferring the title "Moth", utilizes a gas mask and a compression gun which he calls a "Stinger". Moth later appeared as a member of Richard Dragon's Longbow Hunters. He first appeared in the "Zero Year" story arc in which he was defeated by both Batman and Green Arrow, teaming up for the first time. In DC Rebirth, Killer Moth is again Drury Walker, a low-level criminal sporting a purple outfit and helmet.

Unknown 
A new Killer Moth appears in Batman #652, during the Face the Face storyline wherein he displays competence in hand-to-hand combat and the ability of flight when facing Robin. He later appears working alongside fellow Gotham criminals the Firefly and Lock-Up in the Gotham Underground miniseries. The identity and origins of this new Killer Moth remain unrevealed. Several villains clad in Killer Moth costumes appear in Secret Six (vol. 3) #7. At least one of them is killed by Deadshot. Killer Moth recently appeared in the first issue of the miniseries Justice League: Cry for Justice. He was hired by Prometheus to kidnap and torture Mike Dante, ex-assistant to Atom ally Professor Hyatt. The two current holders of the Atom identity, Ray Palmer and Ryan Choi, tracked Killer Moth and his goons down to a hideout in Albuquerque, New Mexico and defeated them all. Ray Palmer then tortured Killer Moth by entering his head via the nasal pathways and growing inside his skull. Killer Moth immediately gave up Prometheus as his employer. In Red Robin #9, Red Robin returns to Gotham City where he runs into Killer Moth in his classic costume, holding a man at gunpoint. Red Robin thinks to himself: "I think this is Killer Moth. The costume and the man change from time to time, so you can never really tell". This Killer Moth seems to be scared and on the run, stating: "Are you with him? Are you with the Atom? I won't let you torture me, too!"

Powers, abilities, and equipment 
In his original incarnation, Killer Moth has no superhuman abilities, but relies on the vast array of equipment he had developed. His range of gimmicks includes a Mothmobile and zipline cables, which allows him to swing through the skies as if he were flying. He even carries a cocoon gun that fires streams of sticky threads to totally envelop his victims. As Charaxes, he possesses immense strength, stamina, durability, speed, agility, and reflexes, as well as winged flight, natural weapons, and the secretion of acidic substances. 

In the New 52, he utilizes an air pistol, which shoots out compressed waves powerful enough to stop bullets in mid-air.

In other media

Television 

 A short episode of the 1960s Batman series that introduced Batgirl featured Killer Moth (portrayed by Tim Herbert), but it was never aired. It had since been circulated through bootlegs on the Internet or at conventions, and in 2014 was finally released as a bonus feature in the official complete DVD/Blu-ray sets.
 When asked about Killer Moth's inclusion in The New Batman Adventures, producer Bruce Timm expressed little interest and joked that the only way they would use him is if they can cast Canadian actor Dan Aykroyd for the role and have him scream, "I'm a bug!". Producer Alan Burnett, on the other hand, stated, "we just haven't thought of a good story for him yet". Ultimately, Killer Moth never appeared in the series.
 Killer Moth appears in Teen Titans, initially voiced by Thomas Haden Church and later by Marc Worden. This version possesses bio-engineering expertise, a background in lepidopterology, and a spoiled daughter named Kitten (voiced by Tara Strong). In the episode "Date with Destiny", he attempts to use mutant moths to take over Jump City. However, at the prodding of Kitten, whose boyfriend Fang (voiced by Will Friedle) recently broke up with her, Killer Moth forces Robin to take Kitten to her junior prom instead. With Starfire's help, Robin breaks the moth control device and Killer Moth, Fang, and Kitten are subsequently arrested while Beast Boy secretly adopts one of Killer Moth's mutant larva and names it Silkie. In the episode "Can I Keep Him?", Silkie bonds with Starfire and resists Killer Moth's attempts to control it. As of the episodes "Calling All Titans" and "Titans Together", Killer Moth and Kitten have joined the Brotherhood of Evil to attack young heroes across the world, but the expanded Teen Titans regroup and eventually defeat the Brotherhood.
 A variation of Killer Moth appears in The Batman, voiced by Jeff Bennett. This version is a physically weak individual based on the Drury Walker incarnation with a milquetoast personality and poor combat capabilities. In the episode "Team Penguin", Killer Moth joins the Penguin's eponymous team, but serves as an errand boy until he is exposed to chemical fumes and radioactive moths that mutate him into a monstrous Charaxes-esque form nicknamed "Mothy". He intimidates the other members of Team Penguin into obeying their leader before they are all eventually defeated by Batman, Robin, and Batgirl. Killer Moth also makes a brief appearance in the episode "Rumors" as a prisoner of the vigilante Rumor.
 Killer Moth appears in Batman: The Brave and the Bold, voiced by Corey Burton. This version is based on the Drury Walker incarnation and once used the Cameron van Cleer alias.
 Killer Moth appears in Teen Titans Go!, voiced by Scott Menville. This version has a base underneath the Jump City Bridge.
 A variation of Killer Moth appears in the DC Super Hero Girls episode "#BreakingNews". This version is a gigantic mutant creature.

Film 
 Killer Moth appears in Batman: Bad Blood, voiced by Jason Spisak. This version is a mercenary working for the League of Assassins and serves as one of Talia al Ghul's henchmen, frequently working with Firefly to attack enemies from above. He is later crushed by a boulder while fighting Batwing.
 Killer Moth appears in The Lego Batman Movie.
 Killer Moth was meant to appear in Batgirl.

Video games 
Killer Moth appears as a boss in the NES Batman game.

LEGO 

 The Drury Walker incarnation of Killer Moth appears as a playable character and boss in Lego Batman: The Video Game, with vocal effects provided by Steve Blum. This version is attracted to bright lights like his namesake, wields a handgun, and can glide. In the Nintendo DS version, Killer Moth in both his original form and one based on his appearance in the Teen Titans animated series appear as unlockable characters.
 Killer Moth appears as an optional boss and a playable character in Lego Batman 2: DC Super Heroes, voiced by Joseph Balderrama.
 Killer Moth appears as a playable character in Lego Batman 3: Beyond Gotham, voiced by Christopher Corey Smith.

Merchandise 
 An action figure of Killer Moth in his Charaxes form was released in Mattel's The Batman: Shadowtek line in 2006.
 Corgi Toys released a die-cast Killer Mothmobile in their Batman line in 2006.
 A collector's version of Corgi's Killer Mothmobile, including a statuette of Killer Moth, was released in 2007.
 An action figure of Killer Moth was released in Wave 6 of Mattel's DC Universe Classics line in 2009.
 Three LEGO Minifigures based on Killer Moth have been produced. The first appeared in set 26054 Scarecrow: Harvest of Fear in 2016. The second appeared in set 76069 Batman vs. Killer Moth, as part of the Mighty Micros line released in 2017. The third was released in 2018 as part of the second Collectible Minifigure blind-bag series based on The Lego Batman Movie.
 An action figure of a modernized Killer Moth was released in Spin Master's Creature Chaos Line in 2020.

Miscellaneous 
 The Batman incarnation of Killer Moth in his Charaxes form appears in The Batman Strikes!.
 The Teen Titans animated series incarnation of Killer Moth appears in Teen Titans Go!.
 The Drury Walker incarnation of Killer Moth appears in the Batman: Arkham Knight prequel comic.
 Killer Moth appears in the DC Super Hero Girls web series, voiced by Phil LaMarr. This version talks with a lisp.
 Killer Moth appears in the first two issues of the Injustice 2 prequel comic as a member of the Suicide Squad before he is killed by Jason Todd disguised as a murderous Batman copycat.

See also 
 List of Batman family enemies

References

External links
 Killer Moth at Comic Vine

Characters created by Bill Finger
Characters created by Dick Sprang
DC Comics characters who can move at superhuman speeds
DC Comics characters with superhuman strength
DC Comics metahumans
DC Comics male supervillains
Golden Age supervillains
Comics characters introduced in 1951
Comics characters introduced in 1995
Fictional businesspeople
Fictional butterflies and moths
Fictional characters who have made pacts with devils
Fictional characters with superhuman durability or invulnerability
Fictional mercenaries in comics
Batman characters
Video game bosses